Allium passeyi is a plant species endemic to Box Elder County in northwestern Utah. It grows in shallow, stony locations at elevations of 1400–1600 m.

Allium passeyi produces 2-3 round to egg-shaped bulbs, each up to 2 cm in diameter. Flowers are bell-shaped, up to 9 mm in diameter; tepals pink; pollen yellow.

References

passeyi
Flora of Utah
Onions
Plants described in 1974
Flora without expected TNC conservation status